The Australian states each elected three members of the Australian Senate at the 1910 federal election to serve a six-year term starting on 1 July 1910.

Australia

New South Wales

Each elector voted for up to three candidates. Percentages refer to the number of voters rather than the number of votes.

Queensland

Each elector voted for up to three candidates. Percentages refer to the number of voters rather than the number of votes.

South Australia

Each elector voted for up to three candidates. Percentages refer to the number of voters rather than the number of votes.

Tasmania

Each elector voted for up to three candidates. Percentages refer to the number of voters rather than the number of votes.

Victoria

Each elector voted for up to three candidates. Percentages refer to the number of voters rather than the number of votes.

Western Australia

Each elector voted for up to three candidates. Percentages refer to the number of voters rather than the number of votes.

See also 
 Candidates of the 1910 Australian federal election
 Results of the 1910 Australian federal election (House of Representatives)
 Members of the Australian Senate, 1910–1913

Notes

References

1910 elections in Australia
Senate 1910
Australian Senate elections